Liu Guoqiang (born December 1953) is a former Chinese politician who spent his entire career in his home-province Liaoning. He was investigated by China's top anti-graft agency in July 2020. He has retired for three years, prior to that, he served as vice-chairman of the Liaoning Provincial Committee of the Chinese People's Political Consultative Conference (CPPCC) from 2013 to 2017, vice-governor of Liaoning from 2001 to 2013, and mayor of Benxi from 2000 to 2001. He was a delegate to the 10th and 11th National People's Congress.

In November 2022, Liu was sentenced to death with a two-year reprieve for bribery.

Early life and education
Liu was born in Benxi, Liaoning, in December 1953. After the outbreak of the Cultural Revolution, he became a sent-down youth in his home-county for a short time. In September 1970, he joined as a worker at the Department of Transport of Benxi Iron and Steel Company, where he worked for almost eight years. In March 1978, he was accepted to Dalian Railway Institute (now Dalian Jiaotong University). After graduating in January 1982, he continued to work at Benxi Iron and Steel Company. He served in various posts before serving as general manager in May 1997.

Political career
He began his political career in March 2000, when he was appointed deputy party chief, vice-mayor and acting mayor of Benxi. After just one year and two months, he was elevated to vice-governor of Liaoning, a position he held until January 2013. During his term in office, he was in charge of industry and production safety. In February 2005, the 2005 Sunjiawan mine disaster occurred, at least 214 coal miners were killed, he was suspended and made a self-criticism. Then he became the vice-chairman of the Liaoning Provincial Committee of the Chinese People's Political Consultative Conference (CPPCC), and served in the post until his retirement in January 2017.

Investigation
On July 13, 2020, he was put under investigation for alleged "serious violations of discipline and laws", the Central Commission for Discipline Inspection said in a statement on its website, without elaborating.

On January 11, 2021, he was expelled from the Communist Party of China (CPC) and dismissed from public office. Prosecutors signed an arrest order for him on January 22.

On November 8, 2022, Liu was sentenced to death with a two-year reprieve for taking bribes over 352 million yuan (48 million U.S. dollars) by the Tianjin First Intermediate People's Court.

Personal life
Liu married Chen Chiping, who died in a plane crash on June 1, 2009. Liu and his late wife were alleged to have used public money to pay for an expensive overseas holiday disguised as a business trip.

References

1953 births
Living people
People from Benxi
Dalian Jiaotong University alumni
Northeastern University (China) alumni
People's Republic of China politicians from Liaoning
Chinese Communist Party politicians from Liaoning
Delegates to the 10th National People's Congress
Delegates to the 11th National People's Congress